The 1968 Memphis State Tigers football team represented Memphis State University (now known as the University of Memphis) as an independent during the 1968 NCAA University Division football season. In its 11th season under head coach Billy J. Murphy, the team compiled a 6–4 record (4–0 against conference opponents), won the MVC championship, and outscored opponents by a total of 258 to 170. The team played its home games at Memphis Memorial Stadium in Memphis, Tennessee. 

The team's statistical leaders included Danny Pierce with 925 passing yards, Ray Jamieson with 573 rushing yards, Preston Riley with 484 receiving yards, and Jay McCoy with 60 points scored.

Schedule

References

Memphis State
Memphis Tigers football seasons
Missouri Valley Conference football champion seasons
Memphis State Tigers football